Brad Farynuk (born January 22, 1982 in Enderby, British Columbia) is a Canadian professional ice hockey player currently playing with Tohoku Free Blades in the Asia Hockey League. He has played over 300 professional hockey games (53 games in the American Hockey League, 175 in the ECHL, and 148 in the ALH).

Playing career
After captaining the final two years and graduating from Rensselaer Polytechnic Institute (Troy, NY) with a dual engineering degree Brad went on to play professional hockey in Dayton Ohio for the Dayton Bombers.  During the season he split his time with the Syracuse Crunch.  The following year Farynuk played in California for the Stockton Thunder.  There he was Captain and an ECHL All Star. Again, during the season he split his time with the AHL and played 20 games for the Springfield Falcons.

In the 2008-09 season, Brad was the Captain for the South Carolina Stingrays and led them to win the Kelly Cup Championship. The AHL's Quad City Flames had Brad playing in 17 games that season.

In 2009 Farynuk went and played for a new team in the Asia Hockey League called the Tohoku Free Blades.  He was voted the Best Offensive Defender. In 2010 he returned to Hachinohe, Aomori, Japan with his wife to play for the Free Blades again. The team was scheduled to play in the Championship but the day before game 1, disaster struck Japan.  They experienced a devastating earthquake and tsunami forcing the league to cancel the rest of playoffs.  The league named both teams (Halla and FreeBlades) co-champions for the 2010-2011 season.

In 2011 Brad played in the Italian League for Renon. Then in the 2012-2013 season Farynuk returned to Japan for a third season.  The team won playoffs and were Asia League Champions.  The following season Brad played for the FreeBlades again as assistant captain.  This season (2014-2015) Farynuk returns to the Free Blades for his fifth season and is once again the assistant captain.

Career stats

References

External links 

1982 births
Living people
Ice hockey people from British Columbia
People from the Regional District of North Okanagan
Dayton Bombers players
Quad City Flames players
RPI Engineers men's ice hockey players
Syracuse Crunch players
Stockton Thunder players
Springfield Falcons players
South Carolina Stingrays players
Tohoku Free Blades players
Vernon Vipers players
Canadian ice hockey defencemen